Hiroden-ajina is a Hiroden station on Hiroden Miyajima Line, located in Ajina, Hatsukaichi, Hiroshima.

Routes
From Hiroden-ajina Station, there is one of Hiroden Streetcar routes.
 Hiroshima Station - Hiroden-miyajima-guchi Route

Connections
█ Miyajima Line

Ajina-higashi — Hiroden-ajina — Hiroden-miyajima-guchi

Other services connections

JR lines
JR lines connections at JR Ajina Station
JR Ajina Station is directly connected from Hiroden-ajina Station by the overpass.

Around station
JR Ajina Station

History
Opened as "Tajiri" on August 1, 1978.
Renamed to "Hiroden-ajina" on November 1, 2001.

See also

Hiroden Streetcar Lines and Routes

References

Hiroden Miyajima Line stations
Railway stations in Japan opened in 1978